Madras Rediscovered: A Historical Guide to Looking Around is a book on the history of Chennai (previously known as Madras) authored by Chennai historian S. Muthiah. Originally titled Madras Discovered, the first edition was published in 1981. Since then, the book has emerged a bestseller  and has run into eight editions. A Tamil translation of the book Chennai Marukandupidippu by C. V. Karthik Narayan was published in 2009.

Editions 

The first edition titled Madras Discovered was published in 1981 by East-West Books. It was 160 pages long and priced at Rs. 10. The second edition of Madras Discovered, 286 pages long was published in 1987 followed by the third edition in 1993, 363 pages long, which was augmented by a supplement titled "Once Upon a City". The fourth edition which came in 1999 was titled Madras Rediscovered. The fifth edition which came in 2004 was priced at Rs. 360 and was 427 pages long.

Criticism 

Journalist Bishwanath Ghosh considers Muthiah's Madras Rediscovered, the "last word on the city's heritage". One review by Outlook Traveller describes the book as follows.

Notes

References 

 
 http://www.frontline.in/cover-story/memories-of-madras/article6328325.ece#test

1981 non-fiction books
English-language books
History of Chennai